339 Grand Street, also addressed as 57 Ludlow Street, located at the corner of Ludlow Street in the Lower East Side neighborhood of Manhattan, New York City was completed in c. 1831–1833 in the Federal style as one of five row houses constructed by John Jacob Astor on property he purchased in 1806. The early tenants of the building were several dry goods merchants. The rear addition on Ludlow Street was built c.1855. The front of the house has been a storefront since at least 1884.

The house, a rare example of a surviving Federal-style house in Manhattan, is the only one of the five row houses built by Astor that is still largely intact. It features "a front facade with Flemish bond brickwork, high peaked roof and dormer", and the rear retains its "flat roof, stone lintels and sills, and cornice."

The house was designated a New York City landmark by the New York City Landmarks Preservation Commission on October 29, 2013.

See also
List of New York City Designated Landmarks in Manhattan below 14th Street

References

Houses in Manhattan
New York City Designated Landmarks in Manhattan
Grand Street (Manhattan)